Roderick Craig Broadway (born April 9, 1955) is an American former college football coach. He served as the head football coach at North Carolina Central University from 2003 to 2006, Grambling State University from 2007 to 2010, and North Carolina Agricultural and Technical State University from 2011 to 2017, compiling a career head coaching record of 125–45. He is the only coach to win a black college football national championship at three different schools.

Early life and playing career
Broadway was born April 9, 1955 in Oakboro, North Carolina and attended West Stanly High School. A 1977 graduate of the University of North Carolina at Chapel Hill, Broadway played on the defensive line from 1974 to 1977.  He helped lead the North Carolina Tar Heels to the 1974 Sun Bowl and the 1977 Liberty Bowl.  Broadway earned All-Atlantic Coast Conference honors as a senior in 1977.

Coaching career
Before taking over at Grambling, Broadway was as an assistant coach at the NCAA Division I-A level for 22 years.  In 2002, he took over the struggling football program at North Carolina Central University (NCCU), then an NCAA Division II school in Durham, North Carolina.  The school had gone 2–8 the year before Broadway took over.  Broadway led North Carolina Central Eagles to Central Intercollegiate Athletic Association (CIAA) championships and black national championships, in 2005 and 2006.  During his final three seasons at NCCU Broadway had a combined record of 29–4.  He closed out his tenure at NCCU with a record of 33–11.

Broadway became the head football coach at Grambling State University in 2007.  In his second year at Grambling State, he led the Tigers to an 11–2 record and the 2008 Southwestern Athletic Conference (SWAC) championship and black national championship.

On February 2, 2011, Broadway resigned from his position as head coach at Grambling State University, and the following day it was announced that he accepted the position of head coach at North Carolina A&T. Broadway, replaced Alonzo Lee who was in his second year at the position before his release. In 2015, he led the Aggies to Mid-Eastern Athletic Conference (MEAC) and black national titles.

In 2017, Broadway's NCA&T Aggies capped off a perfect season defeating the once-beaten Grambling Tigers in  the  Celebration to win another black national titles.

While Broadway's background, as a coach and as a player, is rooted in defense, his teams at North Carolina Central and Grambling Statewere known for their explosive offenses.

Personal life
In June 2004, Broadway's wife, Dianne, died after 14 years of battling scleroderma, a rheumatic disease of the connective tissues.

Head coaching record

References

1955 births
Living people
Duke Blue Devils football coaches
East Carolina Pirates football coaches
Florida Gators football coaches
Grambling State Tigers football coaches
North Carolina A&T Aggies football coaches
North Carolina Central Eagles football coaches
North Carolina Tar Heels football coaches
North Carolina Tar Heels football players
People from Oakboro, North Carolina
Coaches of American football from North Carolina
Players of American football from North Carolina
African-American coaches of American football
African-American players of American football
20th-century African-American sportspeople
21st-century African-American sportspeople